Bangong may refer to:
Bangong Lake, or Pangong Tso, lake at the border of China and India
Bangong suture, suture in the central Tibet conjugate fault zone